Nolasena is a monotypic moth genus of the family Erebidae. Its only species, Nolasena ferrifervens, is found in India, Sri Lanka, Borneo and the Philippines. Both the genus and species were first described by Francis Walker in 1858.

Description
Palpi porrect (extending forward), where the second joint fringed with hair above, and third acute at apex. Antennae minutely ciliated. Forewings with slightly acute apex. Veins 8 and 9 anastomosing (fusing) to form an areole.

The species' wingspan is 18–21 mm. Forewings are olive coloured. There are two broad and colourful oblique bands. Both bands running from the costa to the inner margin. Costal dots near the apex are white. Forewings with double, oblique, dark antemedial fasciae. Postmedial fascia more irregular, white edged, and dark coloured. Head broad, olive brown and covered with smooth scales. Labial palps long, porrect and pale beige or pale olive brown. Thorax and abdomen olive brown and are stout and short. Legs pale beige or pale yellowish grey. Hindwings are dark greyish brown.

References

Calpinae
Monotypic moth genera
Moths of Asia
Moths described in 1857